Gillisia hiemivivida is a bacterium from the genus of Gillisia.

References

Flavobacteria
Bacteria described in 2005